Parastacus is a genus of southern crawfish in the family Parastacidae. There are about 15 described species in Parastacus, found in South America. In addition, there are some preserved specimens from Australia that are possibly members of this genus.

Species
These 15 species belong to the genus Parastacus:
 Parastacus brasiliensis (von Martens, 1869)
 Parastacus buckupi Huber, Ribeiro & Araujo, 2018
 Parastacus caeruleodactylus Ribeiro & Araujo, 2016 (blue-fingered burrowing crayfish)
 Parastacus defossus Faxon, 1898
 Parastacus fluviatilis Ribeiro & Buckup, 2016 (highland streams crayfish)
 Parastacus laevigatus Buckup & Rossi, 1980
 Parastacus macanudo Huber, Rockhill, Araujo & Ribeiro, 2020
 Parastacus nicoleti (Philippi, 1882)
 Parastacus pilicarpus Huber, Ribeiro & Araujo, 2018
 Parastacus pilimanus (von Martens, 1869)
 Parastacus promatensis Fontoura & Conter, 2008
 Parastacus pugnax (Poeppig, 1835)
 Parastacus saffordi Faxon, 1898
 Parastacus tuerkayi Ribeiro, Huber & Araujo, 2017
 Parastacus varicosus Faxon, 1898

References

External links

 

Parastacidae